This is a list of the most important palaces in Italy, sorted by city.

Ancona
Palazzo Bosdari

Ascoli Piceno
Palazzo dei Capitani del Popolo

Bergamo
Palazzo della Ragione

Bernalda
Palazzo Margherita

Bologna

Palazzo d'Accursio
Palazzo Albergati
Palazzo dell'Archiginnasio – Former University of Bologna
Palazzo Comunale, Bologna
Palazzo Magnani
Palazzo dei Notai
Palazzo Orsi Mangelli
Palazzo del Podestà
Palazzo Poggi
Palazzo Re Enzo

Brescia
Palazzo della Loggia

Caltagirone
Palazzo Senatorio, Caltagirone

Caprarola
Palazzo Farnese

Caserta
Reggia di Caserta
Palazzo Reale – Former royal residence for Bourbon kings of Napoli

Castel Gandolfo
Papal Palace of Castel Gandolfo the summer residence of the pope, the head of the Catholic Church

Catania
Palazzo Asmundo

Cefalù
Palazzo Atenasio Martino

Colorno
Palazzo Ducale

Cremona
Palazzo Pubblico

Ferrara
Palazzo dei Diamanti – Currently houses 'Pinacoteca Nazionale'
Palazzo Costabili – Also known as Palazzo di Ludovico il Moro
Palazzo del Municipio
Palazzo della Ragione
Palazzo Sacrati
Palazzo Schifanoia

Florence

Palazzo Antinori
Palazzo delle Assicurazioni Generali (Florence)
Palazzo Bardi
Bargello – Also known as the "Palazzo del Popolo" and "Palazzo del Podestà"
Palazzo Bartolini-Salimbeni
Palazzo Borghese
Palazzo Budini Gattai
Palazzo Capponi alle Rovinate
Palazzo Corsini
Palazzo Davanzati
Palazzo Fenzi
Palazzo Ginori
Palazzo Gondi
Palazzo Guadagni
Palazzo Guicciardini
Palazzo Medici-Riccardi
Palazzo Mozzi
Palazzo Niccolini
Palazzo Panciatichi
Palazzo Pandolfini
Palazzo Pazzi
Palazzo Pitti – Largest museum complex in Firenze

Palazzo Pucci
Palazzo Quaratesi
Palazzo Rucellai
Palazzo Spini Feroni
Palazzo Strozzi
Palazzo Tornabuoni
Palazzo del Tribunale di Mercanzia
Uffizi
Palazzo Uguccioni
Palazzo Vecchio – Also known as the Palazzo della Signoria
Palazzo Ximenes da Sangallo
Palazzo Zuccari

Foggia
Palazzo Dogana

Foligno
Palazzo Trinci

Forlì

Palazzo Hercolani
Palazzo Sangiorgi

Genoa
Palazzo Bianco
Palazzo Cattaneo Adorno
Palazzo Cambiaso
Palazzo Carrega Cataldi
Palazzo Doria Pamphilj
Palazzo Doria Tursi – Currently the City Hall of Genoa
Palazzo Ducale
Palazzo Durazzo-Pallavicini
Palazzo Gambaro
Palazzo Giustiniani
Palazzo Imperiale
Palazzo Pallavicino Cambiaso

Palazzo del Principe
Palazzo Reale
Palazzo Rosso
Palazzo San Giorgio
Palazzo Sauli
Palazzo Spinola
Palazzo dell'Università

Grosseto
Palazzo Aldobrandeschi
Palazzo Comunale
Palazzo del Genio Civile
Palazzo del Monte dei Paschi
Palazzo del Vecchio Tribunale
Palazzo Moschini
Palazzo Tognetti

Gubbio
Palazzo dei Consoli

Imola
Palazzo Tozzoni

Lucca
Palazzo Ducale
Palazzo Micheletti
Palazzo Pfanner

Macerata
Palazzo Buonaccorsi
Palazzo dei Diamanti

Mantua
Palazzo Arco
Palazzo Bonacolsi
Palazzo Ducale
Palazzo Te
Palazzo degli Uberti

Messina
Palazzo Calapaj

Milan
Palazzo Litta
Palazzo Marino
The Royal Palace of Milan
Palazzo Taverna

Modena
Palazzo Ducale – Now a military academy
Palazzo di Musei

Montepulciano
Palazzo Contucci
Palazzo Gagnati

Naples

Palazzo Arcivescovile
Palazzo Como
Palazzo Doria d'Angri
Palazzo Reale
Palazzo Serra di Cassano
Royal Palace (or Reggia) of Capodimonte – Summer palace of the kings of the Two Sicilies, now site of the museum of Capodimonte.

Padua
Palazzo del Bò
Palazzo Moroni
Palazzo della Ragione – Reputed to have the largest roof unsupported by columns
Palazzo Zuckerman

Palermo
Palazzo Abatellis
Palazzo Ajutamicristo
Palazzo Arcivescovile
Palazzo Chiaramonte
Palazzo Isnello
Palazzo dei Normanni – Former residence of Holy Roman Emperors and kings of Sicily
Palazzo Valguarnera-Gangi

Parma
Palazzo del Conservatore
Palazzo del Giardino
Palazzo del Governatore
Palazzo della Pilotta

Perugia
Palazzo del Municipo
Palazzo dei Priori

Piacenza
Palazzo Farnese
Palazzo dei Mercanti
Palazzo Pubblico

Pienza
Palazzo Piccolomini
Palazzo Pubblico

Pisa
Palazzo Agostini
Palazzo della Carovana – The main building of Scuola Normale di Pisa
Palazzo dei Cavalieri di Santo Stefano
Palazzo del Collegio Puteano
Palazzo Gambacorti
Palazzo Giuli Rosselmini Gualandi, which hosts the museum Palazzo Blu.
Palazzo Medici
Palazzo delle Vedove

Potenza
Palazzo Loffredo

Prato
Palazzo Pretorio

Rieti
Palazzo Vicentini

Rome

Palazzo Altavity
Palazzo Altemps
Palazzo Altieri
Palazzo Baldassini
Palazzo Barberini – Galleria Nazionale d'Arte Antica
Palazzo Borghese
Palazzo Brancaccio
Palazzo Braschi – Last palace committed in Rome by the Pope for their families
Palazzo della Cancelleria – Former papal palace
Palazzo Carpegna
Palazzo Chigi – Seat of the Italian Cabinet; residence of the prime minister of Italy
Palazzo della Civiltà Italiana – Also known as 'Square Colosseum', in the EUR district
Palazzo Colonna
Palazzo dei Congressi
Palazzo dei Conservatori – Gallery founded in 1471, located in Campidoglio
Palazzo della Consulta
Palazzo Corsini – Office of the Accademia dei Lincei
Palazzo Donatelli-Ricci
Palazzo Doria Pamphilj
Palazzo delle Esposizioni – Rome's largest exhibition space
Palazzo Farnese – Currently French Embassy in Italy
Palazzo della Farnesina
Palazzo Giustiniani
Palazzo di Giustizia – Supreme Court of Italy
Palazzo Grazioli
Palazzo Lancellotti ai Coronari
Palazzo Laterano – Seat of the Diocese of Rome
Palazzo Madama – Seat of the Italian Senate
Palazzo Malta
Palazzo Mancini
Palazzo Margherita
Palazzo Massimi
Palazzo Massimo alle Colonne
Palazzo Massimo alle Terme – Main branch of National Museum of Rome
Palazzo Mattei
Palazzo Montecitorio – Italian Parliament
Palazzo Muti
Palazzo Nuovo – Comprising the Capitoline Museums with Palazzo dei Conservatori
Palazzo Odescalchi
Palazzo Muti Papazzurri
Palazzo Pallavicini-Rospigliosi
Palazzo Pamphilj
Palazzo Pio
Palazzo Poli
Palazzo di Propaganda Fide
Palazzo del Quirinale – Residence from the Pope to the President
Palazzo Rondinini
Palazzo Ruspoli
Palazzo Santacroce
Palazzo della Sapienza – Old seat of the University of Rome
Palazzo Sciarra
Palazzo delle Scienze
Palazzo Senatorio – City Hall of Rome
Palazzo Spada
Palazzo dello Sport
Palazzo Taverna – built by Cardinal Giordano Orsini
Palazzo del Vaticano – Official residence of the Pope
Palazzo Valentini
Palazzo di Venezia – Former the Embassy of the Republic of Venice
Palazzo Zuccari

Salerno
Palazzo Pinto

Sarzana
Palazzo del Capitano

Sassari
Palazzo Giordano Apostoli
Palazzo della Provincia
Palazzo Ducale
Palazzo d'Usini

Siena
Palazzo Chigi Sarracini
Palazzo delle Papesse
Palazzo Pubblico – In the Piazza del Campo
Palazzo Spannocchi
Palazzo Tolomei

Syracuse
Palazzo Bellemo
Palazzo Beneventano del Bosco
Palazzo Migliaccio
Palazzo Vermexio

Taormina
Palazzo Corvaia
Palazzo San Stefano

Todi
Palazzo del Capitano
Palazzo del Popolo
Palazzo dei Priori

Trento
Palazzo delle Albere
Palazzo Communale
Palazzo Geremia
Palazzo Pretorio
Palazzo Salvadori

Turin

Palazzo dell'Accademia delle Scienze
Palazzo Carignano
Palazzo Madama
Palazzo Reale – Former residence of the kings of Piedmont
Palazzina di Stupinigi, Stupinigi (near Turin)

Udine
Palazzo dell'Arcivescovado

Urbino
Palazzo Ducale

Venice

Palazzo Barbarigo
Palazzi Barbaro
Palazzo Bembo
Palazzo Cavalli-Franchetti
Palazzo Contarini del Bovolo
Palazzo Cornaro
Palazzo Corner della Ca' Grande
Palazzo Corner Spinelli 
Palazzo Dandolo
Palazzo Dario
Palazzo Ducale – Former seat of the Doge of Venice
Palazzo Dolfin Manin
Palazzo Farsetti
Palazzo Fortuny
Palazzo Foscari
Palazzo Grassi
Palazzo Grimani di San Luca
Palazzo Grimani di Santa Maria Formosa
Palazzo Labia – Regional HQ of RAI(Radiotelevisione Italiana)
Palazzo Loredan
Palazzo Malipiero
Palazzo Molina
Palazzo Morosini Brandolin
Palazzo Pisani a San Stefano
Palazzo Pisani Gritti
Palazzo Pisani Moretta
Palazzo Regio
Palazzo Tiepolo
Palazzo Vendramini
Palazzo Zorzi Galeoni (currently houses the offices of UNESCO in Venice)

In Venice some palazzi are conventionally called Ca'  ("casa"):
Ca' da Mosto
Ca' d'Oro
Ca' Farsetti
Ca' Pesaro
Ca' Rezzonico
Ca' Zenobio
Pisani Moreta
Cavalli Franchetti
Contarini Flangini

Verona
Palazzo Bevilacqua
Palazzo Canossa
Palazzo del Comune
Palazzo del Consiglio
Palazzo Franchini
Palazzo Pompeii

Vicenza
Palazzo Barbarano
Palazzo Braschi
Palazzo del Capitanio
Palazzo Chiericati
Palazzo Leoni-Montanari
Palazzo Porto in Piazza Castello
Palazzo Thiene
Palazzo Valmarana

Viterbo
Palazzo Farnese
Palazzo dei Papi di Viterbo – Former papal seat from 1257 to 1281

Volterra
Palazzo dei Priori

See also
Ducal Palace (disambiguation)

Palaces

Palaces
Italy